Corona de lágrimas is a Mexican telenovela produced by José Alberto Castro for Televisa. It follows a mother who worries about the welfare of her sons and is always willing to sacrifice anything for their well-being. The telenovela stars Victoria Ruffo, José María Torre, Mané de la Parra and Alejandro Nones. It premiered on 24 September 2012. In August 2021, the telenovela was renewed for a second season that premiered on 29 August 2022.

Series overview

Episodes

Season 1 (2012–13)

Season 2 (2022–23)

Notes

References 

Corona de lagrimas